Farrukh Dustov and Malek Jaziri were the defending champions, but decided not to compete.

Sergey Betov and Alexander Bury won the title, defeating Nicolás Barrientos and Stanislav Vovk in the final, 6–7(6–8), 7–6(7–1), [10–3].

Seeds

Draw

Draw

References
 Main Draw

Fergana Challenger - Men's Doubles
2014 Men's Doubles